The episodes for the twenty-first and final season of the anime series Naruto: Shippuden are based on Part II of Masashi Kishimoto's manga series. The episodes are directed by Hayato Date, and produced by Pierrot and TV Tokyo. The season aired from October 2016 to March 2017.

The season contains three musical themes, including one opening and two endings. The opening theme,  by Anly, is used from episode 480 to 500. The first ending theme,  by Ayumikurikamaki, is used from episode 480 to 488. The second ending theme,  by Swimy, is used from episode 489 to 500.


Episode list

Home releases

Japanese

English

References

General

Specific 
 

2016 Japanese television seasons
2017 Japanese television seasons
Shippuden Season 21